Martin Luluga (1 March 1933 – 30 July 2022) was a Ugandan Roman Catholic prelate, who served as the Bishop of the Diocese of Nebbi. He was appointed bishop of Nebbi on 2 January 1999 and he retired on 8 February 2011.

Early life and priesthood
Luluga was born on 1 March 1933, at Lodonga, in present-day Yumbe District in the West Nile sub-region, in the Northern Region of Uganda. He was ordained priest on 1 June 1963 at Arua. He served as priest in the Roman Catholic Diocese of Arua, until 17 October 1986.

As bishop
He was appointed bishop on 17 October 1986, serving as Auxiliary Bishop of Gulu and as Titular Bishop of Aquae in Dacia. He was consecrated as bishop on 11 January 1987 at Gulu by Bishop Cipriano Biyehima Kihangire†, Bishop of Gulu, assisted by Bishop Cesare Asili†,  of Lira and Bishop Frederick Drandua†, Bishop of Arua.

On 8 February 1990 he was appointed bishop of the Roman Catholic Archdiocese of Gulu, replacing Bishop Cipriano Biyehima Kihangire. He was appointed Bishop of Nebbi on 2 January 1999. He resigned as bishop on 8 February 2011.

Illness and death
He died on the morning of 30 July 2022 at Nebbi, as Bishop Emeritus of Nebbi Roman Catholic Diocese. He was 89 years old.

See also
 Uganda Martyrs
 Roman Catholicism in Uganda

References

External links
Composition of Health Commission of Uganda Catholic Medical Bureau As of 2017. 
Martin Luluga at Catholic Hierarchy

1933 births
2022 deaths
20th-century Roman Catholic bishops in Uganda
21st-century Roman Catholic bishops in Uganda
People from Yumbe District
Roman Catholic bishops of Nebbi
Roman Catholic bishops of Gulu
Bishops appointed by Pope John Paul II